In mathematics, a quaternion algebra over a field F is a central simple algebra A over F that has dimension 4 over F. Every quaternion algebra becomes a matrix algebra by extending scalars (equivalently, tensoring with a field extension), i.e. for a suitable field extension K of F,  is isomorphic to the 2 × 2 matrix algebra over K.

The notion of a quaternion algebra can be seen as a generalization of Hamilton's quaternions to an arbitrary base field. When , then the biquaternions form the quaternion algebra over F.

Structure
Quaternion algebra here means something more general than the algebra of Hamilton's quaternions. When the coefficient field F does not have characteristic 2, every quaternion algebra over F can be described as a 4-dimensional F-vector space with basis , with the following multiplication rules:

where a and b are any given nonzero elements of F.  From these rules we get:

The classical instances where  are Hamilton's quaternions (a = b = −1) and split-quaternions (a = −1, b = +1).

The algebra defined in this way is denoted (a,b)F or simply (a,b).  When F has characteristic 2, a different explicit description in terms of a basis of 4 elements is also possible, but in any event the definition of a quaternion algebra over F as a 4-dimensional central simple algebra over F applies uniformly in all characteristics.

A quaternion algebra (a,b)F is either a division algebra or isomorphic to the matrix algebra of 2 × 2 matrices over F; the latter case is termed split.  The norm form

defines a structure of division algebra if and only if the norm is an anisotropic quadratic form, that is, zero only on the zero element.  The conic C(a,b) defined by

has a point (x,y,z) with coordinates in F in the split case.

Application
Quaternion algebras are applied in number theory, particularly to quadratic forms. They are concrete structures that generate the elements of order two in the Brauer group of F.  For some fields, including algebraic number fields, every element of order 2 in its Brauer group is represented by a quaternion algebra. A theorem of Alexander Merkurjev implies that each element of order 2 in the Brauer group of any field is represented by a tensor product of quaternion algebras.  In particular, over p-adic fields the construction of quaternion algebras can be viewed as the quadratic Hilbert symbol of local class field theory.

Classification
It is a theorem of Frobenius that there are only two real quaternion algebras: 2 × 2 matrices over the reals and Hamilton's real quaternions.

In a similar way, over any local field F there are exactly two quaternion algebras: the 2 × 2 matrices over F and a division algebra.
But the quaternion division algebra over a local field is usually not Hamilton's quaternions over the field.  For example, over the p-adic numbers Hamilton's quaternions are a division algebra only when p is 2.  For odd prime p, the p-adic Hamilton quaternions are isomorphic to the 2 × 2 matrices over the p-adics. To see the p-adic Hamilton quaternions are not a division algebra for odd prime p, observe that the congruence x2 + y2 = −1 mod p is solvable and therefore by Hensel's lemma — here is where p being odd is needed — the equation

x2 + y2 = −1

is solvable in the p-adic numbers. Therefore the quaternion

xi + yj + k

has norm 0 and hence doesn't have a multiplicative inverse.

One way to classify the F-algebra isomorphism classes of all quaternion algebras for a given field F is to use the one-to-one correspondence between isomorphism classes of quaternion algebras over F and isomorphism classes of their norm forms.

To every quaternion algebra A, one can associate a quadratic form N (called the norm form) on A such that

for all x and y in A. It turns out that the possible norm forms for quaternion F-algebras are exactly the Pfister 2-forms.

Quaternion algebras over the rational numbers

So there are two choices for

The rational 2 × 2 matrices are split at all places.

The analogy comes from a quadratic field having real embeddings when the minimal polynomial for a generator splits over the reals and having non-real embeddings otherwise. One illustration of the strength of this analogy concerns unit groups in an order of a rational quaternion algebra:

The number of places where a quaternion algebra over the rationals ramifies is always even, and this is equivalent to the quadratic reciprocity law over the rationals.
Moreover, the places where B ramifies determines B up to isomorphism as an algebra.  (In other words, non-isomorphic quaternion algebras over the rationals do not share the same set of ramified places.) The product of the primes at which B ramifies is called the discriminant of B.

See also
Composition algebra
Cyclic algebra
Octonion algebra
Hurwitz quaternion order
Hurwitz quaternion

Notes

References

Further reading

 
  See chapter 2 (Quaternion Algebras I) and chapter 7 (Quaternion Algebras II).
  (See section on quaternions.)
 Quaternion algebra at Encyclopedia of Mathematics.

Composition algebras
Algebra